Marcus Kink (born 13 January 1985) is a German professional ice hockey forward who is currently playing as the Captain for Adler Mannheim in the Deutsche Eishockey Liga (DEL).

He has represented the German national team in numerous IIHF World Championships tournaments and was nominated to the Olympic Games in 2018.

Career statistics

Regular season and playoffs

International

Awards and honours

References

External links
 

1985 births
Adler Mannheim players
German ice hockey left wingers
Heilbronner Falken players
Füchse Duisburg players
Kölner Haie players
Living people
SC Riessersee players
Sportspeople from Düsseldorf
Ice hockey players at the 2018 Winter Olympics
Medalists at the 2018 Winter Olympics
Olympic ice hockey players of Germany
Olympic medalists in ice hockey
Olympic silver medalists for Germany